Sofiya Hristova Georgieva (born 20 September 1995) is a Bulgarian freestyle wrestler. She is a bronze medalist at the European Games.

Career 

At the 2018 European U23 Wrestling Championship held in Istanbul, Turkey, she won the silver medal in the 65 kg event. In 2019, she represented Bulgaria at the European Games in Minsk, Belarus and she won one of the bronze medals in the 68 kg event.

In March 2021, she won one of the bronze medals in the 68 kg event at the Matteo Pellicone Ranking Series 2021 held in Rome, Italy. In April 2021, she was eliminated in her second match in the 65 kg event at the European Wrestling Championships in Warsaw, Poland. In October 2021, she was eliminated in her first match in the 72 kg event at the World Wrestling Championships held in Oslo, Norway.

In 2022, she won one of the bronze medals in the 65 kg event at the Dan Kolov & Nikola Petrov Tournament held in Veliko Tarnovo, Bulgaria. She also competed at the Yasar Dogu Tournament held in Istanbul, Turkey. In April 2022, she lost her bronze medal match in the 65 kg event at the European Wrestling Championships held in Budapest, Hungary. She competed in the 68 kg event at the 2022 World Wrestling Championships held in Belgrade, Serbia.

Achievements

References

External links 

 

Living people
1995 births
Place of birth missing (living people)
Bulgarian female sport wrestlers
Wrestlers at the 2019 European Games
European Games bronze medalists for Bulgaria
European Games medalists in wrestling
21st-century Bulgarian women